The Pebidian Supergroup is an Ediacaran (i.e. late Precambrian) lithostratigraphic supergroup (a sequence of rock strata) in Pembrokeshire, west Wales. The term 'Pebidian' (along with Dimetian) was coined by geologist Henry Hicks in 1876 and published in a scientific paper in the Quarterly Journal of the Geological Society in the following year. It was named for Pebidiauc, an ancient local name for the St Davids area.

Outcrops
These rocks are exposed in the St David's peninsula in northwestern Pembrokeshire. One outcrop stretches east from Treginnis, wrapping around the north of St David's to Treglemais. Another underlies Hayscastle Cross with scattered outcrops elsewhere in the area.

Lithology and stratigraphy
The supergroup comprises at its base the Treginnis, Treglemais and Penrhiw 'Groups' of the Lower Pebidian which include trachytic and andesitic tuffs and halleflinta. Overlying these are the tuffs, lavas and conglomerates of the Caerbwdy Group, Ramsey Sound Group and the Rhosson Group. Uppermost i.e. youngest is the Ogofgolchfa Group which includes slates and tuffs. This whole assemblage has also been referred to as the Pebidian Volcanic Complex or Pebidian Volcanic Series.

References

Ediacaran Europe
Ediacaran geology
Geology of Wales
Geologic formations of the United Kingdom